The Franco-Chinese Bank, in French Banque Franco-Chinoise (BFC), full name Banque Franco-Chinoise pour le Commerce et l’Industrie, was a French bank with operations in China and French Indochina, and later in the Indian Ocean and the French West Indies. In 1925 it succeeded the Société française de gérance de la Banque industrielle de Chine, an asset management company that had been formed in October 1922 following the collapse of the Banque Industrielle de Chine.

In 1964, after the loss of much of its original activity in Asia, its name was changed to Banque Française pour le Commerce, and in 1968, to Banque Française Commerciale, thus preserving the acronym BFC. The BFC brand survives in Banque Française Commerciale Océan Indien, since 2003 a joint venture between Mauritius Commercial Bank and Société Générale with operations in Réunion and Mayotte.

Société française de gérance de la Banque industrielle de Chine (1922-1925)

The  was created in October 1922 to manage the Banque Industrielle de Chine (BIC), which had been under bankruptcy protection since July 1921. Its first annual general meeting in December 1923 was held in the premises of the BPPB, emphasizing the latter's dominance in the new entity. By 1924 it had revived the BIC's activities in most of its past branches in France (Lyon and Marseille), China Beijing, Guangzhou, Hankou, Hong Kong, Shanghai and Tianjin), and French Indochina (Haiphong, Hanoi and Saigon).

Banque Franco-Chinoise (1925-1964)

On , the shareholders of the  approved its renaming as the Franco-Chinese Bank. The bank developed its network in Indochina, opening new branch offices in Vinh (June 1927), Tourane (September 1927), and Huế (September 1927). By 1931 another branch office existed in Quy Nhon, and by 1932 in Phnom Penh.

The bank faced difficulties in the late 1930s. It closed its branch in Haiphong from October 1936. In late 1936 it was persuaded by Jean Monnet to partner with the China Development Finance Corporation for infrastructure development in China, but the plan was compromised by the second Sino-Japanese War. Its capital was restructured in 1938 with participation by the BPPB, the Banque de l'Indochine, and Lazard frères & Cie. By 1939, the bank only retained Asian branch offices in Beijing, Shanghai and Tianjin in Chine, and Hanoi, Saigon and Phnom Penh in Indochina.

In 1951, having lost its Chinese business to the country's Communist Revolution (the branches formally closed in 1955) and realizing that its geographical concentration in Indochina entailed high risk, the bank sought to diversify by establishing branches in French Madagascar. After the French defeat in 1954 at Diên Biên Phu, the bank closed its offices in North Vietnam but still expanded in South Vietnam and Cambodia, with branches in Battambang and Kampong Cham.

In 1960, the Banque de l'Indochine purchased the shares in the Franco-Chinese Bank formerly held by the BPPB and Lazard. In 1963, Cambodia nationalized its banking sector, though the BFC was allowed to retain a representative office in Phnom Penh. By then, its remaining branch locations were in Saigon, Chợ Lớn and Khánh Hưng in South Vietnam, and Tananarive and Tamatave in Madagascar.

Banque Française pour le Commerce (1964-1968)

In 1965, the government of South Vietnam wished to create a domestic bank sector.

A change in French law in 1967 liberalized branching, enabling BFC to increase the number of its branches in mainland France.

Banque Française Commerciale (since 1968)

In Madagascar, the BFC's operations were affected by political turmoil that commenced in 1972. That same year, the fall of Saigon put an end to the BFC's activity in South Vietnam. In Cambodia, during the terror launched by the Khmer Rouge regime, the bank's representative, an ethnic Chinese, and his family were all assassinated.

BFC decided to pivot towards the Indian Ocean. In 1976 it established a branch in Réunion, and also established a branch in Mayotte at the request of the French Government, as the island's pre-existing banking services disappeared after its split from the Comoros. It also opened branches in 1981 in the Seychelles, and in 1982 in Dominica.

By early 1975, the Banque de l'Indochine held 79 percent of the BFC's equity. In 1985, Banque Indosuez, the successor entity of the Banque de l'Indochine since 1975, decided to split BFC into three entities with respective operations in France (BFC-France), Reunion, Mayotte and the Seychelles (Banque Française Commerciale Océan Indien / BFCOI); and the French West Indies and Guiana ( / BFCAG). BFC-France was acquired in 1989 by Istituto Bancario San Paolo di Torino. In 1992, Mauritius Commercial Bank acquired BFCOI, of which Société Générale purchased 50 percent in 2003. BFCAG was acquired by Crédit Agricole in 1996 together with the rest of Banque Indosuez, and was fully absorbed into Credit Agricole's subsidiary LCL S.A. in 2015.

Leadership

The following individuals were chairmen of the board of BFC:
  (October 1922-January 1931)
 Georges Goy (January 1931-January 1936)
  (January 1936 – 1938)
  (1938-early 1940s)
 Émile Oudot (early 1940s-August 1956)

Goerges Carrère was the bank's general manager until joining the board of directors in March 1936. He had no successor on that position.

See also
 Banque Industrielle de Chine
 Russo-Chinese Bank
 Deutsch-Asiatische Bank

Notes

French colonisation in Asia
Concessions in China
Defunct banks of China